The Treasury Note (also known as a Coin Note) was a type of representative money issued by the United States government from 1890 until 1893 under authority of the Sherman Silver Purchase Act in denominations of , , , , , ,  and . A  note was designed but never issued.

Usage

The government issued the Treasury Note to individuals selling silver bullion to the Treasury. Unlike other redemption notes like silver and gold certificates (which stipulated whether the note was backed by and redeemable for silver or gold coin, respectively), Treasury Notes stipulated only that they were redeemable in coin. This allowed the Treasury to fulfil the note's obligation in silver coin, gold coin, or both, at its discretion when the note was redeemed. This flexibility allowed the Treasury some control over releasing gold or silver when the relative value of the two metals fluctuated. The origin of the term "Coin Note" to describe the note is unclear – it may refer either to the coin it could be exchanged for, or derive from the fact that it was issued to pay for silver that would later be turned into coins.

Description

Treasury Notes are large-size ("average" dimension is ) banknotes.  The portrait of General George Meade on the  Note was engraved by renowned artist and line engraver Charles Burt.  The 100 Greatest American Currency Notes, a 2006 book by Q. David Bowers and David Sundman, put the ,000 Treasury Note (Fr#379b), nicknamed the "Grand Watermelon", at the top of its list.  Of the seven "Grand Watermelon" notes known to exist today, only three are available to collectors: two of the Large Brown Treasury Seal variety (Fr#379a), pictured above; and only one example of the Small Red Treasury Seal variety (Fr#379b).

A distinguishing feature of the Series 1890 notes (and one that greatly appeals to collectors) is the extremely ornate designs on the reverse side of the notes. The intent of this was to make counterfeiting much more difficult, but opponents of the design argued that the extensive detail would make it more difficult to distinguish between genuine and counterfeit notes. Consequently, the reverse designs were simplified on the Series 1891 Treasury Notes issued the following year.

Auction history

The other variety of  Treasury Notes, Series 1891 "Open Backs" (Fr#379c), represented by just two notes, has also been involved in the recent string of record-breaking sales. While one of these two notes is owned by the Smithsonian Institution (pictured at bottom), the only Series 1891  note available to collectors had set the world record in March 2006.

Gallery of Treasury Note images
The Treasury Notes pictured below are from the 1890 and 1891 series. Images are from the National Numismatic Collection at the National Museum of American History (Smithsonian Institution).

Notes

References

Currency lists
 Historical currencies of the United States
 Paper money of the United States
 Banknotes of the United States